Arkadiy Tumanyan (born 23 January 1998) is a professional Armenian and Ukrainian football midfielder.

References

External links
 
 Arkadiy Tumanyan at ZeroZero
 

1998 births
Living people
Footballers from Kharkiv
Armenian footballers
Ukrainian footballers
Ukrainian people of Armenian descent
Association football midfielders
FC Chornomorets Odesa players
Sevan FC players
Ukrainian Premier League players
Armenian First League players